Kateryna (Ekaterina) Proida (born 3 August 1989 in Dnipropetrovsk) is a Ukrainian former competitive figure skater. She competed at four ISU Championships, qualifying to the free skate at the 2005 World Junior Championships and 2006 European Championships.

Programs

Competitive highlights 
JGP: Junior Grand Prix

References

External links 

 

1989 births
Ukrainian female single skaters
Living people
Sportspeople from Dnipro
Competitors at the 2009 Winter Universiade